Ellie M Falconer (born 3 August 1999) is an Australian cricketer who plays as a right-handed batter and right-arm medium bowler for the South Australian Scorpions in the Women's National Cricket League (WNCL) and the Melbourne Renegades in the Women's Big Bash League (WBBL). She made her Scorpions debut on 22 September 2018 against Victoria, taking one wicket for 31 runs.

References

External links

1999 births
Adelaide Strikers (WBBL) cricketers
Australian women cricketers
Cricketers from South Australia
Living people
People from Clare, South Australia
South Australian Scorpions cricketers
Melbourne Renegades (WBBL) cricketers